Estella Oriental is a comarca in Navarre, Spain.

Municipalities
The comarca consists of thirty-nine municipalities, with the largest being the municipality of Estella-Lizarra. They are listed below with their populations at recent censuses, together with the most recent official estimate:

References 

Comarcas of Navarre